Sargodha District  (Punjabi and ),  is a district of Punjab, Pakistan. The capital of the district is Sargodha. It is an agricultural district, wheat, rice, and sugarcane along with Kinno being its main crops. The Sargodha district and region is also famous for citrus fruit including Kinnow, orange and lemon. The district has an area of 5,864 km2.

Etymology 
It is believed that there was an old pond in the middle of the town where an old Hindu monk or sadhu (godha) used to live. The Sanskrit word for pond is "ser". Since the town had a modest population, people would refer the place as 'ser godha', the place where that famous Sadhu resided next to the pond.

Administration and tehsils
Sargodha city is the administrative headquarter of Sargodha Division and handles the population of about 8.1 million. Sargodha District is administratively divided into Seven Tehsils, which contain a total of 161 Union Councils. Following are the seven tehsils of Sargodha district:
Sargodha
Kot Momin
Bhalwal
Shahpur
Sillanwali
Sahiwal
Bhera

Demographics
At the time of the 2017 census the district had a population of 3,696,212, of which 1,867,724 were males and 1,828,074 females. Rural population is 2,608,007 while the urban population is 1,144,535. The literacy rate was 65.54%. 

Sargodha District is among the world's best Citrus-producing region. Sargodha District is well known for its kinnow, a citrus variety.

The below list shows the population of each of the seven tehsils of Sargodha district according to the 2017 Census of Pakistan along with area:

Religion 
As per the 2017 census Muslims were the predominant religious community with 98.08% of the population while Christians were 1.76% of the population.

Language 
At the time of the 2017 census, 94.07% of the population spoke Punjabi, 4.31% Urdu and 1.23% Pashto as their first language.

Villages 

Behak Maken 
Chak 101 NB
Chak 104 SB
Hathi Wind  
Ludewala

See also 
Sargodha City
Sargodha Division
Sargodha Cantonment
Sargodha Tehsil

References

 
Districts of Punjab, Pakistan